Jacqueline Ruth Weaver  (born 25 May 1947) is an Australian theatre, film and television actress. Weaver emerged in the 1970s as a symbol of the Australian New Wave through her work in Ozploitation films such as Stork (1971), Alvin Purple (1973), and Petersen (1974). She later she starred in Picnic at Hanging Rock (1975), Caddie (1976), Squizzy Taylor (1982), and well as number of made-for-television movies, miniseries, and Australian productions of some of the most revered plays including Death of a Salesman and Streetcar Named Desire.

In 2010, Weaver has garnered critical acclaim and Academy Award for Best Supporting Actress nomination and won National Board of Review Award for Best Supporting Actress for her performance as the matriarch of a criminal family in the crime film Animal Kingdom. She received another Academy Award for Best Supporting Actress nomination for performance in the romantic comedy-drama film Silver Linings Playbook (2012). The following years, Weaver appeared in films The Five-Year Engagement (2012), Parkland (2013), Magic in the Moonlight (2014), The Disaster Artist (2017), Bird Box (2018), Widows (2018), Poms (2019), Stage Mother (2020), and Father Stu (2022).

On television, Weaver starred in the Starz comedy series, Blunt Talk (2015-2016), Fox Showcase political thriller  Secret City (2016–19), Stan science fiction series Bloom (2019–20) and Epix thriller Perpetual Grace, LTD (2019). In 2021 she began appearing in the recurring role as Caroline Warner in the Paramount Network neo-Western series, Yellowstone.

Early life
Weaver was born in Sydney, Australia. Her mother, Edith (née Simpson), was a migrant from England, and her father, Arthur Weaver, was a Sydney solicitor. She attended Hornsby Girls' High School and was Dux of her school. She won a scholarship to study sociology at university, but instead embarked upon an acting career.

Career

1960s—2000s
Weaver has been working in Australian film, stage and television since the 1960s. In 1963, at the age of 16, Weaver mimed the role of Gretel to the soprano Marilyn Richardson in an ABC production of Humperdinck's Hansel and Gretel, conducted by Sir Charles Mackerras. In 1964 at the Palace Theatre in Sydney, Weaver and a number of other Australian singers such as The Delltones and her then-boyfriend Bryan Davies performed a satire on the Gidget movies, in which Weaver performed as "Gadget". In the mid-1960s, she appeared on the Australian music show Bandstand. In one appearance, she sang a 1920s-style pastiche, the novelty song "I Love Onions". The turning point in her career came in 1965 just before she was about to go to university and was cast in the Australian TV series Wandjina!

In 1971, Weaver made her big screen debut playing the female leading role in the comedy film, Stork directed by Tim Burstall, for which she won her first Australian Film Institute Award. She later starred in the comedy films Alvin Purple (1973), and Petersen (1974). She played supporting role in Peter Weir's critically acclaimed mystery film version of Picnic at Hanging Rock (1975), and a more substantial appearance in Caddie (1976) for which she won her second Australian Film Institute Award. The following years, Weaver appeared in series, miniseries, and made-for-television movies, playing leading and supporting roles. Her notable television movies including Polly Me Love (1976), and Do I Have to Kill My Child? (1976), for which she received Logie Award for Best Individual Performance By An Actress.

Weaver starred in the miniseries Water Under the Bridge (1980) and The Challenge (1986), and 1982 drama film Squizzy Taylor. Also in the 1980s she appeared alongside Sir Les Patterson and politician Barry Jones on Parkinson Contrary to popular belief, Weaver has never appeared in a soap opera. She starred in the 1988 ABC drama series, House Rules about a Melbourne house-wife who becomes a member of parliament. After years off-screen, Weaver returned to film starring in the comedy-drama Cosi. 

In the 1990s and early 2000s, Weaver found it increasingly difficult to gain roles on screen or television and she devoted much of her energy to the Australian stage, starring in plays including A Streetcar Named Desire, Last of the Red Hot Lovers, Death of a Salesman, Reg Cribb's Last Cab to Darwin, and Chekhov's Uncle Vanya alongside Cate Blanchett and Richard Roxburgh in 2010–11. Weaver has performed in more than 80 plays. Her stage abilities were recognised with a "Mo" award. In 2005, she released her autobiography, Much Love, Jac.

2010—present
In 2010, Weaver starred in the Melbourne-set crime thriller Animal Kingdom playing a gang family matriarch. Her performance received positive reviews from film critics and earned her an Academy Award nomination as well as winning the Australian Film Institute Award, the National Board of Review, Los Angeles Film Critics Association Award and a Satellite Award.

Weaver made her Hollywood debut with the 2012 comedy The Five-Year Engagement, alongside Emily Blunt and Jason Segel, and starred in Park Chan-Wook's English-language debut, Stoker, alongside fellow Australian actors Nicole Kidman and Mia Wasikowska, and British actor Matthew Goode. In 2012, Weaver was again nominated for an Academy Award for her role opposite Robert De Niro in the comedy-drama film Silver Linings Playbook.

Weaver played Marguerite Oswald in the 2013 historical drama film Parkland and same year starred in the supernatural horror film Haunt. She made her American television debut guest-starring as a Rebel Wilson' character mother in her short-lived comedy series Super Fun Night. In 2014, she starred in the adaptation of Richard Alfieri's play Six Dance Lessons in Six Weeks opposite Gena Rowlands, Marjane Satrapi's comedy-horror The Voices, and the romantic comedy Magic in the Moonlight written and directed by Woody Allen. She returned to Australia appearing in Last Cab to Darwin (2015) and Goldstone (2016) receiving Australian Film Critics Association for Best Supporting Actress. Her other notable film credits including Equals (2015), The Polka King (2017), Life of the Party (2018), Bird Box (2018) and Widows (2018). She starred alongside Diane Keaton, Pam Grier and Rhea Perlman in the 2019 comedy film Poms (2019). The following year, she played the leading role in the comedy-drama film Stage Mother. Also that year, she starred in The Grudge, a remake of the 2004 supernatural horror film, and the Australian drama Penguin Bloom starring Naomi Watts. In 2022, she played Mark Wahlberg' mother in the biographical drama film Father Stu.

On American television, Weaver starred in the 2015 Fox limited series Gracepoint and the Starz comedy series, Blunt Talk (2015-2016) opposite Patrick Stewart. She returned to Australia with starring role in the Fox Showcase political thriller  Secret City (2016–19), and Stan science fiction series Bloom (2019–20). In 2019, she starred in the Epix thriller Perpetual Grace, LTD (2019) and in 2021 she began appearing in the recurring role as Caroline Warner in the Paramount Network neo-Western series, Yellowstone.

Personal life
Weaver had a relationship of many years with Richard Wherrett, director of the Sydney Theatre Company. She was married to David Price from 1966 to 1970. She had a son in 1970 with her partner at the time, John Walters.

She married Max Hensser in 1975. She lived with Phil Davis, a former Sydney crime reporter, Canberra Press Secretary, and executive producer for Mike Willesee, for five years until 1981. She married radio and television presenter Derryn Hinch in 1983. She and Hinch renewed their vows before divorcing in 1998.

She is married to actor Sean Taylor.

Filmography

Films

Television

Stage

Awards and nominations

Other awards
Best Actress Awards for Joy Gresham in Shadowlands and Dr Georgeous in The Sisters Rosensweig
Variety Club Award for They're Playing Our Song
2013 Australians in Film Breakthrough Award
2014 AACTA Longford Lyell Award for lifetime achievement
2022 Winner of TV Week Silver Logie Award for Most Popular Australian Actor or Actress in an International Program in Yellowstone

Mo Awards
The Australian Entertainment Mo Awards (commonly known informally as the Mo Awards), were annual Australian entertainment industry awards. They recognise achievements in live entertainment in Australia from 1975 to 2016.
 (wins only)
|-
| 2001
| Jacki Weaver
| Female Actor in a Play 
|  
|-

Further reading
 Jane Cadzow, "All or nothing", The Sydney Morning Herald, Good Weekend, 5 December 1998
 Deborah Blashki-Marks, "What I've Learnt: Jacki Weaver", The Age, 8 May 2004

References

External links

 Jacki Weaver at the National Film and Sound Archive

1947 births
20th-century Australian actresses
21st-century Australian actresses
Actresses from Sydney
Australian film actresses
Australian people of English descent
Australian stage actresses
Australian television actresses
Best Actress AACTA Award winners
Best Supporting Actress AACTA Award winners
Best Supporting Actress AACTA International Award winners
Living people
Logie Award winners
Officers of the Order of Australia